Henryk Pachulski (16 October 18592 March 1921) was a Polish-born pianist, composer and teacher who spent most of his life in Russia.

Of noble birth, he was born the son of a surveyor and forester, in Łazy, near Siedlce, Poland. He studied at the Warsaw Institute of Music under Stanisław Moniuszko and Władysław Żeleński, then at the Moscow Conservatory from 1880, studying with Aleksander Michałowski, Pavel Pabst, Nikolai Rubinstein, and Anton Arensky. From 1886 to 1917, he was professor of piano at the conservatory. He never returned to his native country.

Pachulski wrote a Suite for orchestra, a Méditation for string orchestra, a Polish Fantasy for piano and orchestra, works for cello, piano (preludes, études, two sonatas, polonaises, mazurkas, waltzes), and numerous songs, as well as many four-handed piano transcriptions of Tchaikovsky's orchestral music. His Piano Sonata No. 1 in C minor, Op. 19, was dedicated to Arensky, and his Piano Sonata No. 2 in F major, Op, 27, to Sergei Rachmaninoff.

Some of his works have been recorded by Lubow Nawrocka (Henry Pachulski – Piano Works 1, Acte Préalable, Warsaw 2008, AP0187) and Valentina Seferinova and Venera Bojkova (Henryk Pachulski - Piano Works 2, Acte Préalable, London, 2016, AP0361).

His brother Władysław Pachulski (1857–1919) also went to Russia and was employed as a musician by Nadezhda von Meck, the patroness of Pyotr Ilyich Tchaikovsky. He was a secretary to the von Meck family and married von Meck's daughter Yuliya. He is the prime suspect in the breakdown of the relationship between Tchaikovsky and his patroness.

Discography 
 2008 : Piano Works vol. 1 - Acte Préalable AP0187 
 2016 : Piano Works vol. 2 - Acte Préalable AP0361 
 2020 : Piano Works vol. 3 - Acte Préalable AP0487

References

External links
 
 Brief biography 
 
 Scores by Henryk Pachulski in digital library Polona

1859 births
1921 deaths
Polish composers
Russian composers
Russian male composers
Polish classical pianists
Russian classical pianists
Male classical pianists
Polish music educators
Russian music educators
Piano pedagogues
19th-century classical pianists
19th-century male musicians